"Disconnected" is a song by the American heavy metal band Queensrÿche and is the last single released in support of their 1994 album Promised Land.

Formats and track listing 
US 7" single (S7-18553)
"Disconnected" (Rockenfield, Tate) – 4:48
"Bridge" (DeGarmo) – 2:42

US CD single (DPRO-19987)
"Disconnected" (radio edit) (Rockenfield, Tate) – 3:44
"Disconnected" (fade-in version) (Rockenfield, Tate) – 3:57
"Disconnected" (album version) (Rockenfield, Tate) – 4:38
"Silent Lucidity" (live acoustic version) (DeGarmo) – 6:04
"Dirty Little Secret" (DeGarmo, Tate) – 4:07
"Someone Else?" (with full band) (DeGarmo, Tate) – 7:02

Charts

References 

1994 songs
1994 singles
Queensrÿche songs
EMI Records singles
Songs written by Scott Rockenfield
Songs written by Geoff Tate